Articles related to music include:

0–9

A

B

C

D

E

F

G

H

I

J

K

L

M

N

O

P

Q

R

S

T

U

V

W

X

Y

Z

Lists

See also 

 Outline of music
 Glossary of musical terminology
 Glossary of Italian music
 Timeline of musical events

Music
Index of music articles
Music